Derek Michael Warburton (born July 19, 1974) also known as Derek Fabulous, is an American media entrepreneur and celebrity fashion stylist. He attended college at Fashion Institute of Technology, in New York, New York. In 2022, he was named the Style Icon at the NEWYOU Beauty Awards.

Early life
Warburton was raised in Rochester, New Hampshire.  Following his parents’ divorce, Warburton moved to Florida with his mother. Though Warburton's mother had a job, she was unable to afford rent which resulted in Warburton and his mother becoming homeless for eight months. Warburton later moved back to New Hampshire where he graduated from Nute High School. He attended college at the Fashion Institute of Technology in New York, NY but did not complete his degree.  Warburton held his first charity event in Ogunquit, Maine where he had spent many summer vacations.  Before becoming a celebrity stylist, Warburton worked as a makeup artist and marketing director at Giuliano Day Spa in Boston, MA. Warburton began coordinating fashion shows for charitable organizations in the mid 1990s.  His first solo show “Fashion for Aids” raised $15,000 for newly diagnosed HIV/AIDS patients.

Career

Warburton moved to Miami, Fl in 2001 where he became the managing partner of Atomic Style Agency, a role he held for nearly a decade. At Atomic Style Agency, he provided stylists with clothing for video and photo shoots and eventually began styling clients for music videos. In 2006, Warburton designed sets and styled jewelry for Beyoncé's House of Deréon fashion line. Following his work with House of Deréon, Warburton became a stylist for numerous celebrities including Miranda Kerr, Sean Paul, Heather Graham, Shay Mitchell, Josh Henderson, Leah Remini, Jessica Alba, Anthony Anderson, Anne Heche, Katherine McPhee Foster, and Ariel Winter. The Veronicas, Carmen Electra, Annelynne McCord, Mario Lopez Meagan Good Audrina  Partridge and Olivia Culpo. In 2009, he launched a blog, Derek Loves Shopping, that offered affordable fashion advice.

Warburton commented on celebrity fashion and provided style advice during appearances on EXTRA, Dateline, Good Day New York, HuffPost Live, NBC, CBS, ABC, and FOX. He co-hosted UK's Fashion Avenue with Jodi Kidd and Style Network's Big Boutique. In 2010, Warburton made cameo appearances on the third season of the Bravo reality television The Real Housewives of New York. He was the creative director for Macy's North East Tour in 2010. Warburton was presented the International Stylist of the Year Award at the 2011 and 2012 Scottish Fashion Awards in Glasgow, Scotland. From 2010 to 2013, Warburton was the Style Ambassador for New Zealand Fashion week(). In 2013, he was the Style Ambassador for Spiegel and Newport News.In 2015, Warburton appeared on the cover of LaPalme Magazine. Warburton presented the award for International Stylist of the Year at the 2015 Scottish Fashion Awards in London. In 2016, Warburton was the Style Ambassador to Malta and was the cover model for the Trend Prive He was named the Style Ambassador for the Nolcha runway shows during the Fall/Winter 2017 New York Fashion Week. Warburton was included in The Daily Front Row's Who's Who in Fashion Media. He launched his fine jewelry line, “Mr. Warburton” in July 2017 at SwimWeek Style/Au Courant where he was also a keynote speaker.

He was named the Style Ambassador for the Nolcha runway shows during the Fall/Winter 2017 New York Fashion Week. Warburton was included in The Daily Front Row's Who's Who in Fashion Media. He launched his fine jewelry line, “Mr. Warburton” in July 2017 at SwimWeek Style/Au Courant where he was also a keynote speaker. Vous Magazine named him the fashion guru of 2021.

Warburton has contributed style columns for Maxim and Ocean Drive Style Interview Magazine and was the International Style Director for Hong 

Kong's West East. He was a brand ambassador for Old Navy, Lancôme, Asics, Go Smile, Kmart, Charmin Charlie Borghese and Jos A. Bank. In 2017, Warburton was the Celebrity Ambassador for Feeric Fashion Week and host of the Feeric Gala in Romania. In 2019, IFEMA chose Warburton to be a part of its initiative to expand the Mercedes-Benz Madrid Fashion Week globally. Warburton produced and hosted a four part YouTube series, All Access Madrid that highlighted Spanish fashion.
In 2020, Warburton made his acting debut in the digital series The Salon, which was written, directed and produced by Roxanne Messina Captor. Warburton and the rest of the cast and crew of The Salon won the Best Digital Series Award at the 2021 iHollywood Festival.

 Kelsey Grammer and Tom Russo were Executive Producers. Warburton co-starred with an ensemble cast including Harry Shearer and Kate Linder.  The Salon ran a “For Your Consideration” campaign for the 2020 Primetime Emmy Awards. Nominations for the six-episode series were submitted in all major creative, performance and technical categories including Outstanding Short Form Comedy or Drama Series.

Warburton stars as Daniel Bridges in the 2021 feature film Sarogeto, written, directed and produced by Nico Santucci. Eric Roberts, Winsor Harmon and Ikumi Yashimatsu also star in the film which was the first production permitted to shoot in the Aokigahara Forest in Japan.

Magazines

Warburton was a partner and creative director for LaPalme Magazine, which he relaunched in 2016. LaPalme is a quarterly luxury-lifestyle digital and print magazine with distribution across the United States. He is the editor-in-chief of Mr. Warburton, which he founded in 2019. Mr. Warburton is a creative writing photo journal that showcases art, fashion and celebrity. In August 2020, Mr. Warburton's interview with cover star Anne Heche gained widespread media attention for her comments on LGBTQ representation in Hollywood and her past relationship with Ellen DeGeneres, after The Ellen DeGeneres Show’s staff made allegations of a toxic work environment. Mr. Warburton Magazine got a lot of press in 2021 when various media outlets shared cover shoots with Taryn Manning and Daniel Gillies. Since October 2021, Derek Warburton has been the Editor-In-Chief of the fashion and lifestyle magazine British Thoughts Magazine.

In November 2021, Mr Warburton media added Gurus magazine to its roster of properties. With a philosophy made up of 3 words, truth, passion & authenticity the words are each written and hidden on every cover. Warburton is quoted in saying, “ i wanted to create a magazine that was built on wellness and experts that make the world a better place.” Notables that have been on the cover include Emmy award-winning actress Anne Heche, actor and director Peter Facinelli, singer Isabelle Fries and philanthropist Nancy Davis. 

Following the success of Gurus Magazine, Warburton released Los Angeles Inquisitor as a tribute to his dear friend and Emmy Award winner Anne Heche. Heche's cover story on Los Angeles Inquisitor that talked about her memoir, Call Me Anne, was instantly picked up by platforms such as E! News, ET Online, People Magazine, and OK! Magazine. Heche has been a huge influence and inspiration to Warburton and reflects the magazine's motto, "people, places, and all things LA." Los Angeles Inquisitor also did a feature story on Selling Sunset's Amanza Smith, which made waves upon its release.

Brand Collaborations 

In 2022, Derek collaborated with the skincare and make-up company FACE Stockholm to create the Derek Fabulous Collection in celebration of Pride Month. The Launch of the Derek Fabulous Collection was graced by celebrities like Tara Reid, Taryn Manning, Cynthia Bailey, and Princess Martha Louise of Norway. The make-up collection was featured on multiple publications including David’s Guide.

Later in 2022, Derek released his second collaborative effort with FACE Stockholm, the Boundless Collection. Like all of Derek's work, the beauty collection revolved around encapsulating Derek's vibrant and expressive style.

Philanthropy  and activism 
Having experienced homelessness as a teenager, Warburton supports a number of charitable organizations assisting homeless and impoverished people. In 2009, The New York Times profiled Warburton and his volunteer work with Bottomless Closet, an organization that provides professional clothing, job readiness, and post-employment training and coaching services to women on assistance and working poor women. Warburton gives style makeovers to women who are re-entering the workforce. Warburton said, “I started working and creating programs for Bottomless Closet, a nonprofit in NYC where we started “How To Be Derek Fabulous”, a workshop to raise the self-esteem of women who were surviving abuse, poverty, and homelessness. Three months after that began, I got my big break. Ruth La Ferla, one of the most celebrated writers from The New York Times, wrote a story for the Style section about my program that changed my life forever."

In May 2010, Warburton hosted a benefit for Housing Works, an organization that provides assistance to homeless AIDS patients. During the Fall/Winter 2011 New York Fashion Week, Warburton hosted a campaign for the nonprofit, It Gets Better Project, which aims to prevent suicide among LGBTQ youth. Warburton and celebrities including Gabrielle Union, Miguel, Isaac Mizrahi and Amanda Hearst filmed PSAs assuring LGBTQ youth that their lives would improve.

He produced the Real Fashion, Real Women runway show benefiting Bottomless Closet that closed the Fall/Winter 2011 New York Fashion Week and cast 24 women from the organization as models. For the Fall/Winter 2012 New York Fashion Week, Warburton reprised his role as producer for the Real Fashion, Real Women runway show. That year, he cast models for the show which included 21 women from Bottomless Closet and five celebrities with reality stars Aviva Drescher and Kate Gosselin among them. Gosselin's participation garnered substantial backlash on social media.In 2017, Warburton was honored with the Style Ambassadorship to the city of Los Angeles by the California State Assembly for his work with the homeless. Since his appointment, Warburton has planned fundraisers for the Union Rescue Mission, an organization that aids the homeless in Los Angeles. Warburton is a supporter of international water aid charitable organization, Just A Drop and was appointed the organization's Goodwill Ambassador in 2017. Later that year, he traveled with the organization to build wells in Nicaragua. Warburton is one of the content creators for the Social Networth organization in which social media influencers use their platforms to increase the visibility of their selected charities. Since 2019, Warburton has volunteered with the Hollywood Food Coalition, preparing and serving food to the homeless in Los Angeles. Warburton is involved with Rhonda's Kiss, a charitable organization that assists patients with non-medical costs.

Awards 

 Best Digital Series - iHollywood Festival Awards 2021
 NEWYOU Beauty Awards - Style Icon Award 2022

References

External links
derekwarburton.com

Living people
Fashion stylists
Writers from New Hampshire
Writers from New York (state)
Participants in American reality television series
People from Rochester, New Hampshire
1974 births